Oxamic acid is an organic compound with the formula . It is a white, water-soluble solid. It is the monoamide of oxalic acid. Oxamic acid inhibits lactate dehydrogenase A. The active site of lactate dehydrogenase (LDH) is closed off once oxamic acid attaches to the LDH-NADH complex, effectively inhibiting it.

Oxamic acid also has applications in polymer chemistry. It increases the water solubility of certain polymers, including polyester, epoxide, and acrylic upon binding with them.

See also 
 Oxamate, the conjugate base of oxamic acid

References 

Carboxamides
Carboxylic acids